Christine McMahon (born 6 July 1992) is an Irish athlete specialising in the 400 metres. She represented Northern Ireland at the 2010 and 2014 Commonwealth Games.

Her personal best in the event is 56.06	seconds set in Heusden-Zolder in 2016.

International competitions

References

1992 births
Living people
Sportspeople from Belfast
Female hurdlers from Northern Ireland
Irish female hurdlers
Commonwealth Games competitors for Northern Ireland
Athletes (track and field) at the 2010 Commonwealth Games
Athletes (track and field) at the 2014 Commonwealth Games